Arxiomyces is a genus of fungi within the Ceratostomataceae family.

References

External links 
 Arxiomyces at Index Fungorum

Sordariomycetes genera
Melanosporales
Taxa named by David Leslie Hawksworth